The 2020 United States Senate election in South Carolina was held on November 3, 2020, to elect a member of the United States Senate to represent the State of South Carolina, concurrently with the 2020 U.S. presidential election, as well as other elections to the United States Senate, elections to the United States House of Representatives and various state and local elections.

Incumbent Republican Senator Lindsey Graham won re-election for a fourth term and defeated Democratic nominee Jaime Harrison. Bill Bledsoe was also on the ballot, representing the Constitution Party. The primary elections were held on June 9, 2020.

Despite forcasting throughout the last few months of the race showing a very close race as well as Harrison having record fundraising numbers, Graham defeated Harrison by 54.4% to 44.2% and a margin of 10.2% in the November 3, 2020 general election. Harrison slightly outperformed Democratic nominee Joe Biden in the concurrent presidential election, who lost to President Donald Trump by 11.7% in South Carolina. The election coincidentally saw Graham and his Democratic opponent win approximately the same percentage points as in the 2002 senate race, in which Graham won his first term.

Republican primary

Candidates

Nominee
 Lindsey Graham, incumbent U.S. Senator

Eliminated in primary
 Dwayne “Duke” Buckner, attorney and Owner of Buckner Law Firm located in Walterboro
 Michael J. LaPierre, businessman
 Joe Reynolds, Chief Engineer in the U.S. Merchant Marine

Withdrew
 Johnny Garcia, Air Force veteran
 Peggy Kandies, Charleston art teacher, home decorator, and former IBM employee
 Mark Sloan, Greer minister and manufacturing executive
 David Weikle, radio host, U.S. Marine veteran, and candidate for the South Carolina House of Representatives in 2018 (switched to the Libertarian primary)

Declined
 Eric Bolling, former Fox News host
 Mark Burns, Easley pastor and former candidate for South Carolina's 4th congressional district in 2018
 Harlan Hill, Republican (formerly Democratic) political consultant and commentator
 John Warren, Greenville businessman and candidate for Governor of South Carolina in 2018
 Carey Wilson

Endorsements

Polling

with Generic Republican

Results

Democratic primary

Candidates

Nominee
Jaime Harrison, former chair of the South Carolina Democratic Party and associate chairman of the Democratic National Committee

Withdrawn
Gloria Bromell Tinubu, former Georgia state representative, candidate for Lieutenant Governor of South Carolina in 2018, and nominee for South Carolina's 7th congressional district in 2012 and 2014 (endorsed Jaime Harrison)
William Stone, legal researcher
Justin Wooton, activist

Declined
Mandy Powers Norrell, state representative and candidate for lieutenant governor in 2018 (running for reelection)
Bakari Sellers, political commentator and former state representative

Endorsements

Other candidates

Libertarian Party

General Election write-in candidate
Keenan Wallace Dunham, chair of the Horry County Libertarian Party

Withdrawn
David Weikle, radio show host, U.S. marine veteran, and candidate for the South Carolina House of Representatives in 2018 (remained on ballot)

Constitution Party
Bill Bledsoe, Libertarian Party and Constitution Party nominee for the U.S. Senate in 2016 (unofficially withdrew on October 1, 2020, and endorsed Graham, but still remained on the ballot as an active candidate)

Independents

Withdrawn
Lloyd Williams

General election

Predictions

Advertisements
Jaime Harrison ran a number of ads attempting to attract conservative voters from Lindsey Graham by elevating Constitution Party candidate Bill Bledsoe as "too conservative—but in doing so, the would-be attack ad offers up right-wing voters a laundry list of things to like about him". Bledsoe endorsed Graham after withdrawing from the race, but his name remained on the ballot. He criticized the ads as fraudulent.

Meanwhile, Graham ran ads attempting to brand Harrison as a diehard liberal while connecting him with Nancy Pelosi and Chuck Schumer.

Endorsements

Polling
Graphical summary

with generic Democrat

on whether Lindsey Graham deserves to be re-elected

with Generic Republican and Generic Democrat

Fundraising 
In the first quarter of 2020, Harrison outraised Graham, $7.3 million to $5.5 million, but Graham had the lead in cash on hand, with $12 million compared with Harrison's $8 million.

In the third quarter of 2020, Harrison raised $57 million, the largest quarterly total by a U.S. Senate candidate ever, breaking Beto O'Rourke's record in the 2018 Texas election. He has also raised the most ever by a U.S. Senate candidate, beating another of O'Rourke's records.

Debates

Results 
Graham defeated Harrison by over ten percentage points, 54.4% to 44.2% during the November 3, 2020 general election.

Counties that flipped from Democratic to Republican
 Barnwell (largest municipality: Barnwell)
 Calhoun (largest municipality: St. Matthews)
 Darlington (largest municipality: Hartsville)

Counties that flipped from Republican to Democratic
 Charleston (largest municipality: Charleston)

See also
 2020 South Carolina elections

Notes
Partisan clients

Voter samples

References

Further reading

External links
 
 
  (State affiliate of the U.S. League of Women Voters)
 

Official campaign websites
 Keenan Wallace Dunham (L) for Senate 
 Lindsey Graham (R) for Senate
 Jaime Harrison (D) for Senate

2020
South Carolina
United States Senate